The Rivière Jacquot is a tributary of the Sainte-Anne River flowing in the municipalities of Saint-Léonard-de-Portneuf and Sainte-Christine-d'Auvergne, in the MRC Portneuf Regional County Municipality, in the administrative region of Capitale-Nationale, in Quebec, in Canada.

The upper part of the river is mainly served by the route 367 (chemin du rang Saint-Paul), by the chemin du rang Saint-Jacques and the chemin du rang Saint-Georges.

The main economic activities in the sector are forestry and agricultural activities.

The surface of the Jacquot River (except the rapids areas) is generally frozen from the beginning of December to the end of March, but the safe circulation on the ice is generally made from the end of December to the beginning of March.

Geography 
The Jacquot River originates from Lac Simon (altitude ). The north shore of this lake has a resort vocation, located in a forest area in the northwestern part of the municipality of Saint-Léonard-de-Portneuf.

The mouth of this lake is located at:
  south-west of the center of the hamlet Allen's Mill;
  north-west of the village center of Sainte-Christine-d'Auvergne;
  south-west of the village center of Saint-Léonard-de-Portneuf.

  towards the northeast, in particular by crossing the Lac de l'Oasis (altitude ) up to its mouth. Note: Lac de l'Oasis receives on the north side the black stream which drains in particular Lac à l'Ours, Lac en Coeur and Lac Bleu;
  first towards the east, in particular by crossing the route 367 (chemin du rang Saint-Paul) and collecting Fontaine stream (coming from the south), then branching south-east to go around the mountain, to the confluence (coming from the north) of the Rondeau River;
  to the south by collecting a stream (coming from the northwest), up to the Green stream (coming from the east);
  to the south, branching west, to the outlet (coming from the northwest) of the Castor lakes;
  to the south, forming several streamers at the end of the segment, up to the confluence (coming from the west) of the American river;
  to the south, forming a few large streamers at the end of the segment, to its mouth.

From there, the current descends on  generally south and southwest following the course of the Sainte-Anne river, to the northwest bank of the St. Lawrence river.

The use of the soil near the river is mainly forest and agricultural.

Toponymy 
The toponym Rivière Jacquot was formalized on December 5, 1968, at the Place Names Bank of the Commission de toponymie du Québec.

See also 
 Saint-Léonard-de-Portneuf
 Sainte-Christine-d'Auvergne
 Portneuf Regional County Municipality
 Rondeau River
 American River
 Sainte-Anne
 List of rivers of Quebec

References

Bibliography

External links 
 

Rivers of Capitale-Nationale